Barnes Brook is a tributary of North Branch Mehoopany Creek in Wyoming County and Sullivan County, in Pennsylvania, in the United States. It is a high-gradient stream that flows mainly through forested lands, and has one named tributary.

Course
Barnes Brook begins atop Bartlett Mountain in North Branch Township, Wyoming County. It flows west-southwest for a few tenths of a mile before turning northwest and beginning to quickly descend the mountain into a deep valley. After several tenths of a mile, the stream enters Colley Township, Sullivan County and receives its only named tributary, Coffee Brook, from the left. The stream then turns north for several tenths of a mile before turning north-northwest for a few tenths of a mile. It then exits the valley and reaches its confluence with North Branch Mehoopany Creek.

Tributaries
Barnes Brook has one named tributary, which is known as Coffee Brook.

Hydrology, geography, and geology

This is the second-highest gradient of any named direct tributary of North Branch Mehoopany Creek, after Catlin Brook. It flows in a generally northwesterly direction. Mountains in the watershed of the stream include Bartlett Mountain and Briskey Mountain, the latter of which is where its headwaters are.

In an August 2001 study by the Pennsylvania Fish and Boat Commission, Barnes Brook was found to be entirely dry, except for a number of stagnant pools.

Watershed and biology
The stream is entirely within the United States Geological Survey quadrangle of Jenningsville. It joins North Branch Mehoopany Creek near Lovelton.

Only 4 percent of the length of Barnes Brook is within  of a road. However, 51 percent is within  of a road and 64 percent is within  of one. In 2000, the population density of the stream's watershed was 4 people per square mile (10 per square kilometer). Most of the watershed is forested land and part of it is in Pennsylvania State Game Lands Number 57.

Barnes Brook is classified as a Coldwater Fishery. In 2001, the stream was found to lack fish habitats. However, the Pennsylvania Fish and Boat Commission will hold a meeting in January 2018 to consider adding the entire length of the stream, along with many other streams, to its list of wild trout streams.

History
Barnes Brook was entered into the Geographic Names Information System on August 2, 1979. Its identifier in the Geographic Names Information System is 1168736.

Barnes Brook was visited in 2001 by Pennsylvania Fish and Boat Commission biologists, but unlike several streams in the North Branch Mehoopany Creek watershed, electrofishing did not occur, due to low stream flow.

See also
Sciota Brook, next tributary of North Branch Mehoopany Creek going downstream
Smith Cabin Run, next tributary of North Branch Mehoopany Creek going upstream
List of rivers of Pennsylvania

References

Tributaries of North Branch Mehoopany Creek